David Quinn is a comic book writer, known for writing and co-creating Faust alongside artist Tim Vigil. Their book's main storyline, Faust: Love of the Damned, was adapted by director Brian Yuzna as the 2001 film of the same name. A spin-off mini-series, Faust: Book of M, was nominated for the 1999 Bram Stoker Award for Best Illustrated Narrative.

Among other comic book work, Quinn has co-created & written 777: The Wrath as well as written runs on Marvel Comics's Doctor Strange and Chaos! Comics' Lady Death and Purgatori.

References

External links
 
 David Quinn at the Grand Comics Database
 

Living people
American comics writers
Year of birth missing (living people)